The Victoria Police Department (VicPD) is the municipal police force for the City of Victoria and the Township of Esquimalt, British Columbia, Canada. It is the oldest municipal police department in Canada west of the Great Lakes, the first Canadian law enforcement agency to deploy tasers and VicPD created the first digital forensic unit in the country. They are also one of the few police departments in Canada to use the G36 rifle.

VicPD is currently headed by Chief Del Manak, who took office on June 13, 2017.

History
Policing on Vancouver Island was conducted by the Victoria Voltigeurs. The Voltigeurs existed as an armed, uniformed militia that served all Vancouver Island on an "as and when needed" basis. It is thought that they were primarily of Metis background. Following the end of their service, in 1854 a single town constable (Thomas Hall) policed the early town core.

On July 8, 1858, Vancouver Island Governor James Douglas appointed Augustus Pemberton as commissioner of police for the then-British colony. Policing in Victoria pre-dated the city's founding (1862). Pemberton's appointment was published locally on July 17, 1858. The Governor had enlisted ten Jamaican men from San Francisco to form a police force.  They arrived in Fort Victoria in April 1858 aboard the steamship, Commodore. They wore simple blue wool uniforms with tall blue hats. A red sash denoted their authority. The force only lasted about two months and was disbanded because of the racial strife the men attracted.

The department was a shared Crown colony, province and city establishment through until the mid-1870s when control and oversight of the department was left with the young City of Victoria.

The VicPD honours the memory of five officers who have lost their lives serving the citizens of Greater Victoria; the first officer, Constable Johnston Cochrane, was murdered in 1859 and his death is marked as the first known law enforcement death in the Province of British Columbia. The most recent line of duty death was a motorcycle incident that caused the death of Constable Earle Doyle in 1959. The VicPD and their associated Victoria Police Historical Society placed a memorial cairn at their headquarters on Caledonia Avenue inscribing all five names.

Operations

The VicPD is a moderate sized police agency with two stations:

 Main Headquarters Building in Victoria, 850 Caledonia Ave
 West Division in Esquimalt - shared facility with Esquimalt Fire Department and former Township of Esquimalt Public Safety Building

Neighbourhood patrol areas are:

 Esquimalt
 Panhandle
 Selkirk
 Colville
 Parklands
 Rockheights
 Devonshire
 West Bay
 Esquimalt Village
 Saxe Point
 Victoria
 Burnside
 Hillside/Quadra
 North Park
 Oaklands
 Victoria West
 Downtown
 Harris Green
 Fernwood
 North Jubilee
 Rockland
 James Bay
 Fairfield
 Gonzales

Previous VicPD headquarters:

 Fort Victoria
 Victoria Voltigeurs Encampment at Swan Creek and Colquitz Creek area
 Bastion Square Gaol 1860-1880s
 Victoria City Hall 1880s-1918
 Fisgard Street 1918-1996

Organization
The Victoria Police are headed by Chief Constable Del Manak and have a total strength of 241 sworn officers.

Sections and units:

 Main headquarters
 Patrol
 Focused enforcement team (FET)
 Bike squad
 Beat officers
 Traffic section
 CRASH reconstruction team
 Community resource officers
 Investigative services
 VIIMCU (Vancouver Island Integrated Major Crime Unit)
 Major crimes
 Financial crimes
 Special victims unit
 Forensic services
 Forensic identification (IDENT)
 Computer forensics
 Crime prevention and public affairs
 Public affairs
 Block Watch
 Volunteer services
 Reserve program
 Crime-Free Multi-Housing Program
 Operational planning and support
 911 communication centre
 Greater Victoria Emergency Response Team (GVERT) 
 Strike force and street crime
 Exhibit control and purchasing
 Human resources
 Records
 Information technology
 West Division
 School liaison officers
 Youth investigators
 Community resource officer
 K-9 units

The force also recruits reserve constables, otherwise known as "auxiliary constables".

Rank structure

Integrated road safety unit (IRSU)
Four VicPD officers are seconded to the 15-member IRSU. The IRSU is mandated as "providing intelligence led enforcement while targeting aggressive driving behaviors, reducing alcohol-related crashes, distracted driving and encouraging the use of seatbelts and front license plates." within the Capital Regional District. This unit comprises officers from the Saanich Police Department, Victoria Police Department, Oak Bay Police Department, Central Saanich Police and the RCMP under an agreement with the BC Ministry of Public Safety and solicitor general and they patrol in specially marked cars and are able to enforce laws outside their municipal jurisdiction.

Museum
In late 2014, the onsite police museum at the Victoria police station Caledonia headquarters was closed. The 150 years of policing artifacts from the early days of British Columbia to recent times were moved into storage. The VicPD Hall of Honour, which celebrates the accomplishments of both sworn and civilian staff was created in its place. The Hall of Honour was officially opened to the public on September 29, 2015.

In literature 
Victoria resident Stanley Evans has written a series of mysteries featuring a Coast Salish character, Silas Seaweed, who works as an investigator with the Victoria Police Department.

See also
 Combined Forces Special Enforcement Unit of British Columbia

References

External links
 Victoria Police Department Website
 Victoria Police Department Museum information

Law enforcement agencies of British Columbia
Museums in Victoria, British Columbia
Law enforcement museums in Canada
Politics of Victoria, British Columbia